Benjamin Michael Watson  (born 11 June 1989) is a British para cyclist competing in road, time trial and track cycling events in the C3 category.

In 2018 Watson finished second at the UCI World Para-cycling Track Championships in Rio de Janeiro. In the World Road Championships C3 individual time trial he has won bronze both in the 2018 and 2019. Watson won the C3 road race in Yorkshire 2019, which was the first time a para-cycling race took place alongside the UCI Road World Championships.

Cycling career 
Watson has been part of the Great Britain Cycling Team since early 2017.

In 2021 Watson became Paralympic double Champion when he won the Gold Medal in the C3 Men's Time Trial, and the men's C1-3 road race at the Tokyo 2020 Paralympics.

Watson was appointed Member of the Order of the British Empire (MBE) in the 2022 New Year Honours for services to cycling.

References 

1989 births
English male cyclists
UCI Para-cycling World Champions
Living people
Sportspeople from Stockport
Cyclists at the 2020 Summer Paralympics
Medalists at the 2020 Summer Paralympics
Paralympic gold medalists for Great Britain
Paralympic medalists in cycling
Members of the Order of the British Empire